Capital One Tower may refer to:

 Capital One Tower (Louisiana), a Hertz Investment Group tower
 Capital One Tower (Virginia), the headquarters of Capital One